The Bawlpu is the medicine man in the traditional Mizo village, he was called by the villagers to cure sickness and diseases. He performed rituals and sacrifices to heal the sick through propitiation and exorcism. An animal sacrifice will be made by the Bawlpu as per the requirement after the examination of the sick to cure the disease.

In traditional Mizo belief, evil spirits were belief to cause sickness among human beings. So, anyone who suffered from any illness have to consulted Bawlpu for his intervention to cure by acting as a gobetween evil spirits and human beings.

References 

Mizo people
Mizo language